Křížovice is a village, dating back to 1551, located in the Czech Republic, part of Plánice town. It is located about 4 kilometers southwest of this town on the second level of road II/187. There are 39 houses and in 2011 the village had 42 inhabitants.

Gallery

References 

Villages in Klatovy District